Yokahu is a variation of the name Yúcahu, the masculine spirit of fertility in Taíno mythology.

It may also refer to:

Yokahu Lodge, an Order of the Arrow lodge of the Boy Scouts of America's Puerto Rico Council
Yokahú Tower, an observation tower within El Yunque National Forest in the island of Puerto Rico